Leandro Castán da Silva (born 5 November 1986) is a Brazilian international footballer who plays as a centre-back.

Club career

Roma
In the 2012–13 season, he was signed by Roma for a transfer fee of €5.5 million from Corinthians. He earned a place in the starting XI thanks to a number of consecutive solid performances. He scored his first goal for Roma on 8 December 2012 in a 4–2 win over Fiorentina.

In the 2013–14 season, Castán broke into the Roma first team; he cited new manager Rudi Garcia for this.

Torino (loan)
On 10 July 2016, it was announced that Castán would be loaned to Sampdoria for the 2016–17 season. However, on 18 August, just two days prior to the start of the new season, Sampdoria confirmed that the loan had been terminated and that the player had joined Torino on loan instead. Castán featured in 3 out of 5 of the blucerchiati's pre-season matches, including their 3–2 away defeat against FC Barcelona in the Joan Gamper Trophy.

Cagliari (loan)
On 11 January 2018, Castán joined Cagliari on a six-month loan deal.

Vasco da Gama
On 3 August 2018, the player signed for Vasco da Gama.

International career
Castán said he did not believe that he would be called up by Scolari to play at the 2014 FIFA World Cup because of Dante, also a left foot defender, already being on the list.

Personal life
In 2014, it was found out that he had a cavernoma in his brain. He did undergo surgery in December 2014, but due to his recovery he missed most of the 2014–15 season. He returned to practice for the 2015–16 pre season.

References

External links
 Profile at Soccerway
 CBF profile

1986 births
Living people
Footballers from São Paulo (state)
Association football central defenders
Brazilian footballers
Brazil international footballers
Brazilian expatriate footballers
Clube Atlético Mineiro players
Helsingborgs IF players
Grêmio Barueri Futebol players
Sport Club Corinthians Paulista players
A.S. Roma players
U.C. Sampdoria players
Torino F.C. players
Cagliari Calcio players
CR Vasco da Gama players
Guarani FC players
Campeonato Brasileiro Série A players
Campeonato Brasileiro Série B players
Allsvenskan players
Serie A players
Expatriate footballers in Sweden
Expatriate footballers in Italy
Brazilian expatriate sportspeople in Sweden
People from Jaú